The John Day Dam is a concrete gravity run-of-the-river dam spanning the Columbia River in the northwestern United States. The dam features a navigation lock plus fish ladders on both sides. The John Day Lock has the highest lift (at ) of any U.S. lock. The reservoir impounded by the dam is Lake Umatilla, and it runs  up the river channel to the foot of the McNary Dam. John Day Dam is part of the Columbia River Basin system of dams.

Location 
The closest town on the Oregon side is Rufus, Oregon. It joins Sherman County, Oregon with Klickitat County, Washington,  upriver from the mouth of the Columbia near Astoria, Oregon.

History 
Construction of the dam began in 1958 and was completed in 1971, making it the newest dam on the lower Columbia, at a total cost of US$511 million. The pool was filled in 1968 and a dedication ceremony was held on September 28, 1968. John Day Dam was built and is operated by the U.S. Army Corps of Engineers. The condemnation of land upstream of the dam led to the Supreme Court case United States v. Rands, a well-known case regarding the constitutional doctrine of navigable servitude. The dam's power generation capacity is 2,480,000 kW (overload capacity). 
The dam underwent a major repair to the upper lock gate in 2010, as documented in an episode of the National Geographic Channel program World's Toughest Fixes.

Specifications 
 
 Altitude: 266 feet (81 m) above sea level
 Height: 183 feet (56 m)
 Length: 7,365 feet (2,327 m)
 Navigation lock:
 Single-lift
 86 feet (26 m) wide
 675 feet (206 m) long
 Powerhouse
 Sixteen 135,000 kW units
 Total capacity: 2,160 MW
 Overload capacity: 2,485 MW
 Spillway
 Gates: 20
 Length: 1,228 feet (374 m)

Images

See also 

 Hydroelectric dams on the Columbia River
 List of power stations in the United States
 List of hydroelectric power stations
 List of dams in the Columbia River watershed
 List of largest hydroelectric power stations in the United States

Sources

References

External links 

John Day Dam US Army Corps Engineers

Dams on the Columbia River
Dams in Oregon
Dams in Washington (state)
Hydroelectric power plants in Washington (state)
Hydroelectric power plants in Oregon
Buildings and structures in Sherman County, Oregon
Buildings and structures in Klickitat County, Washington
Run-of-the-river power stations
United States Army Corps of Engineers dams
Dams completed in 1971
Energy infrastructure completed in 1971
1971 establishments in Oregon
Gravity dams
1971 establishments in Washington (state)
Dams with fish ladders